Tirupati Secunderabad Superfast Express is a Superfast train belonging to South Central Railway zone of Indian Railways  that run between  and  in India.

Background

Service

Routes

Traction

External links
 12731 Tirupati–Secunderabad Express
 12732 Secunderabad–Tirupati Express

References

Express trains in India
Rail transport in Andhra Pradesh
Rail transport in Karnataka
Rail transport in Telangana
Transport in Tirupati
Transport in Secunderabad